Grytten is a surname. Notable people with the surname include:

Frode Grytten (born 1960), Norwegian writer and journalist
Ola Honningdal Grytten (born 1964), Norwegian economics historian
Sigurd Grytten (born 1972), Norwegian politician
Torbjørn Grytten (born 1995), Norwegian footballer